The 1954 U.S. Women's Open was the ninth U.S. Women's Open, held July 1–3 at Salem Country Club in Peabody, Massachusetts. It was the second conducted by the United States Golf Association (USGA).

Babe Zaharias won her third U.S. Women's Open, twelve strokes ahead of runner-up Betty Hicks, a record victory margin which still stands. It was the last of her ten major championships and her final U.S. Women's Open as a competitor.

Zaharias missed the event in 1953 while recovering from surgery for colon cancer. She did not defend in 1955 due to back surgery, which discovered that cancer had recurred near her sacrum and she died in September 1956 at age 45.

Future four-time champion Mickey Wright, age 19, was the low amateur and tied for fourth place. She was paired with Zaharias on Saturday for the final two rounds and impressed the three-time champion.

Past champions in the field

Source:

Final leaderboard
Saturday, July 3, 1954

Source:

References

External links
USGA final leaderboard
U.S. Women's Open Golf Championship
U.S. Women's Open – past champions – 1954

U.S. Women's Open
Golf in Massachusetts
Sports competitions in Massachusetts
Sports in Essex County, Massachusetts
Events in Peabody, Massachusetts
Women's sports in Massachusetts
U.S. Women's Open
U.S. Women's Open
U.S. Women's Open
U.S. Women's Open